The 1970 Chattanooga Moccasins football team was an American football team that represented the University of Tennessee at Chattanooga during the 1970 NCAA College Division football season. In their third year under head coach Harold Wilkes, the team compiled a 3–8 record.

Schedule

References

Chattanooga
Chattanooga Mocs football seasons
Chattanooga Moccasins football